Corina Lorraine Magofna is a member of the Northern Mariana Islands Senate from Saipan. Magofna was elected to the Senate in the 2022 general election.

Early life and career
Corina Lorraine Magofna has an associate degree in accounting from the University of Hawaii and a bachelor's degree in Business Accounting from the University of Phoenix. For a time, she was the budget officer at the Commonwealth Utilities Corporation.

Political career
In the 2020 general election, Magofna ran for the Northern Mariana Islands House of Representatives for Precinct #3. In 2021, after the death of Republican minority leader Ivan A. Blanco, the Democratic Party of the Northern Mariana Islands nominated Magofna as their candidate for the special election. Magofna defeated Republican candidate Grace “Pitu” Sablan-Vaiagae in the special election and allowed the Democratic Party to gain a full majority in the CNMI House.

In the 2022 general election, Magofna, as an independent, and Democratic candidate Celina R. Babauta won Saipan's two Senate seats. In the 23rd Commonwealth Legislature, Magofna serves as the floor leader for the majority and as chairwoman of the Committee on Resources, Economic Development, Programs and Gaming.

References

Democratic Party (Northern Mariana Islands) politicians
Living people
Northern Mariana Islands Senators
University of Hawaiʻi alumni
University of Phoenix alumni
Year of birth missing (living people)